John E. Stith (born 1947 in Boulder, Colorado) is an American science fiction and mystery author, known for the scientific rigor he brings to adventure and mystery stories.

Redshift Rendezvous, a Nebula Award nominee, is a murder mystery set aboard a space ship traveling through hyperspace, where the speed of light is ten meters per second, so relativistic effects occur at running speed.  The solution respects the laws of physics.  Manhattan Transfer, a novel about an alien abduction of the entire borough of Manhattan, was a Seiun Award nominee in Japan.

Stith's Nick Naught is a detective with a sense of humor in a dystopian future.  He first appeared in Analog Magazine and his exploits (Naught for Hire and Naught Again) have been reprinted in the collection, All For Naught.  Stith's other short fiction has appeared in Amazing Stories, Nature, and Dragon.

His work has been translated into French, German, Italian, Japanese, Portuguese, and Russian. His novels have been bestsellers on Locus and Amazon. He has lived in Colorado Springs since the 1970s.

Stith lived in Alamogordo, New Mexico from second grade through high school, with the exception of one year at Sunspot, New Mexico (when his father worked at Sacramento Peak Solar Observatory) and one year in Tucson, Arizona (when his father worked at Kitt Peak National Observatory). His father also worked at Holloman Air Force Base and White Sands Missile Range on projects including the rocket sled. In the 1950s, the neighbors a few houses down were Jim and Coral Lorenzen, who headed the Aerial Phenomena Research Organization (APRO).

Bibliography

Novels
 Scapescope (1984)
 Memory Blank (1986)
 Death Tolls (1987)
 Deep Quarry (1989)
 Redshift Rendezvous (1990)
 Manhattan Transfer (1993)
 Reunion on Neverend (1994)
 Reckoning Infinity (1997)
 Pushback (2018)

Novellas
 Naught for Hire (published in Analog, July, 1990)
 Tiny Time Machine (published by Amazing Stories, January, 2021) Amazing Stories notice of Tiny Time Machine publication.

Collections
 All for Naught (2005)

Major Awards
 1988 Colorado Authors' League Top Hand Award Winner, best adult fiction original paperback, for Death Tolls
 1989 Colorado Authors' League Top Hand Award Winner, best adult fiction original paperback, for Deep Quarry
 1990 Nebula Award Nominee for Best Novel, for Redshift Rendezvous
 1990 Analog Analytical Laboratory 3rd Place winner for the novella Naught for Hire
 1990 HOMer Award winner for the novella Naught for Hire
 1990 HOMer Award winner for the novel Redshift Rendezvous
 1992 HOMer Award winner for the novelette Naught Again
 1993 Rockies Award Winner for best SF novel of 1993, for Manhattan Transfer
 1994 HOMer Award winner for the novel Reunion on Neverend
 1994 Seiun Award Nominee for best foreign novel, for Manhattan Transfer (translated into Japanese by Takumi Shibano, who wrote under the name Rei Kozumi)
 1997 Colorado Authors' League Top Hand Award Winner, best genre novel, for Reckoning Infinity
 1997 New York Public Library—List of Best Books for Young Adult, for Reckoning Infinity
 1997 La Tour Eiffel/Eiffel Tower Science Fiction Book Prize Nominee for Manhattan Transfer (translated into French by Maryvonne Ssossé)
 2019 Daphne du Maurier Award for Excellence in Mystery/Suspense Nominee for Pushback in Mainstream Mystery/Suspense

Television Appearances
 1987 Science Fiction * Science Fact (SF2), National PBS one-hour, live special with Ben Bova, Arthur C. Clarke, Charles Sheffield, John E. Stith, G. Harry Stine and NASA planner Jesco von Puttkammer.
 1993 Prisoners of Gravity Season 4 episode 16, Mystery/SF. Episode description: a look at the cross-over between mystery and science fiction, with guests P. D. James, John E. Stith, Sean Stewart, Vernor Vinge, Martin H. Greenberg, Maxim Jakubowski, Garfield and Judith Reeves-Stevens, Sharyn McCrumb, Mike Resnick, Beth Meacham, and Jane Yolen.

Video Appearances
Super Relaxed Fantasy Club featuring an excerpt from Tiny Time Machine and brief descriptions of a few favorite science-fiction books (2020)

Selected Short Stories

References

External links
 The John E. Stith web site
 
 John E. Stith at Fantastic Fiction
 The Official Naught for Hire web site
 Naught for Hire on IMDB

Selected Interviews
Interview conducted by Roger Deforest (2006)
Interview conducted by Kalkion (2009)
Interview conducted by Mysteristas (2018)
Interview conducted by John Dwaine McKenna for Mysterious Book Report (2018)
Interview conducted by K L Romo for The Big Thrill—the magazine of International Thriller Writers (2018)

20th-century American novelists
American male novelists
American mystery writers
American science fiction writers
Living people
1947 births
American male short story writers
20th-century American short story writers
20th-century American male writers